Jan Wróblewski may refer to:

 Jan Ptaszyn Wróblewski (born 1936), Polish jazz musician, composer and arranger
 Jan Wróblewski (glider pilot) (born 1940)